Egybolis is a monotypic moth genus of the family Noctuidae erected by Jean Baptiste Boisduval in 1847. Its only species, Egybolis vaillantina, the African peach moth, was first described by Caspar Stoll in 1790. It is found in the Afrotropical realm.

The wingspan is about 60 mm. The moths are active during the day.

The larvae feed on peach and Sapindus species.

Gallery

References

External links 
 

Catocalinae
Owlet moths of Africa
Moths described in 1790
Monotypic moth genera